Falling in Love with Jazz is an album by jazz saxophonist Sonny Rollins, released on the Milestone label in 1989, featuring performances by Rollins with Clifton Anderson, Bob Cranshaw,  Mark Soskin, Jerome Harris and Jack DeJohnette with Branford Marsalis, Tommy Flanagan and Jeff Watts standing in on two tracks. The cover artwork was by Henri Matisse.

Reception

The AllMusic review by Scott Yanow calls the album an "average effort from Sonny Rollins and his regular sextet".

Track listing
All compositions by Sonny Rollins except as indicated
 "For All We Know" (J. Fred Coots, Sam M. Lewis) - 7:42  
 "Tennessee Waltz" (Pee Wee King, Redd Stewart) - 6:18  
 "Little Girl Blue" (Lorenz Hart, Richard Rodgers) - 7:41  
 "Falling in Love with Love" (Hart, Rodgers) - 4:49  
 "I Should Care" (Sammy Cahn, Axel Stordahl, Paul Weston) - 7:33  
 "Sister" - 7:03  
 "Amanda" -5:47  
Recorded in New York on June 3 (tracks 1 & 5), August 5 (tracks 2 & 3) and September 9 (tracks 4, 6 & 7), 1989

Personnel
on tracks 1 & 5 with
Sonny Rollins - tenor saxophone
Branford Marsalis - tenor saxophone
Tommy Flanagan - piano 
Jerome Harris - electric bass
Jeff Watts - drums
on all other tracks
Sonny Rollins - tenor saxophone
Clifton Anderson - trombone (tracks 4, 6 & 7)
Mark Soskin - piano
Bob Cranshaw - electric bass
Jerome Harris - guitar (2 & 3), electric guitar (4, 6 & 7)
Jack DeJohnette - drums

References

1989 albums
Milestone Records albums
Sonny Rollins albums